Anderson Alves da Silva (born 10 January 1983), sometimes known as just Anderson, is a Brazilian footballer who plays for Enosis Neon Paralimni in the Cypriot First Division.

Club career
On 22 June 2009 it was announced that he would be signed by Gold Coast United as a short-term injury replacement for fellow Brazilian Jefferson. At the conclusion of the 2009–10 season Miron Bleiberg offered him a 1-year contract which he accepted. He was released by the club at the end of the 2010–11 A-League.

Personal life
He is the older brother of Robson who also plays for Cypriot club Ayia Napa.

References

External links
 Gold Coast United profile

1983 births
Living people
Brazil youth international footballers
Brazil under-20 international footballers
Brazilian expatriate footballers
CR Flamengo footballers
Criciúma Esporte Clube players
Duque de Caxias Futebol Clube players
Operário Futebol Clube (MS) players
Adap Galo Maringá Football Club players
Rio Branco Esporte Clube players
Gold Coast United FC players
Enosis Neon Paralimni FC players
C.D. Fátima players
Campeonato Brasileiro Série A players
A-League Men players
Cypriot First Division players
Expatriate soccer players in Australia
Expatriate footballers in Cyprus
Brazilian expatriate sportspeople in Cyprus
Association football fullbacks
Footballers from Rio de Janeiro (city)
Brazilian footballers